The following outline is provided as an overview of and topical guide to South Sudan:

South Sudan is a landlocked country in east-central Africa that is part of the United Nations subregion of Eastern Africa. It was previously known as Southern Sudan.  It is located south of Sudan, and includes the vast swamp region of the Sudd, formed by the White Nile and known locally as the Bahr al Jabal. South Sudan became an independent state on 9 July 2011, following a referendum that passed with 98.83% of the vote. It is a United Nations member state, a member state of the African Union, and a member state of the Intergovernmental Authority on Development. In July 2012, South Sudan signed the Geneva Conventions. Its current capital is Juba, which is also its largest city. The capital city is planned to be changed to the more centrally located Ramciel in the future.

General reference 
 Pronunciation:  or 
 Common English country name(s): South Sudan
 Official English country name(s): Republic of South Sudan
 Nickname(s): 
 Common endonym(s):  
 Official endonym(s):  
 Adjectival(s): South Sudanese
 Demonym(s): South Sudanese
 International rankings of South Sudan

Geography of South Sudan 

Geography of South Sudan
 South Sudan is: a country
 Atlas of South Sudan

Location 
 South Sudan is situated within the following regions:
 Time zone(s):

Environment of South Sudan 

Environment of South Sudan
 Climate of South Sudan
 Ecology of South Sudan
 Ecoregions in South Sudan
 Wildlife of South Sudan
 Fauna of South Sudan
 Birds of South Sudan
 Mammals of South Sudan
 Insects of South Sudan
 List of moths of Sudan and South Sudan

Natural geographic features of South Sudan 

Landforms of South Sudan
 Rivers of South Sudan
 World Heritage Sites in South Sudan

Regions of South Sudan 

Regions of South Sudan
Bahr el Ghazal
Equatoria
Greater Upper Nile

Ecoregions of South Sudan

Administrative divisions of South Sudan 

Administrative divisions of South Sudan
 Regions of South Sudan
 States of South Sudan

States of South Sudan 

States of South Sudan
South Sudan is divided into 32 states:

 Imatong State
 Kapoeta State
 Maridi State
 Amadi State 
 Gbudwe State
 Tambura State
 Jubek State 
 Terekeka State
 Yei River State
 Wau State
 Aweil State
 Lol State
 Aweil East State
 Twic State
 Gogrial State
 Tonj State
 Eastern Lakes State
 Western Lakes State
 Gok State
 Northern Liech State
 Southern Liech State
 Ruweng State
 Jonglei State
 Western Nile State
 Northern Upper Nile State
 Central Upper Nile State
 Fangak State
 Bieh State
 Akobo State
 Maiwut State
 Latjor State
 Boma State

Counties of South Sudan 

 Counties of South Sudan – the ten states of the East African country of South Sudan are divided into 86 counties.

Municipalities of South Sudan 

Municipalities of South Sudan
 Capital of South Sudan: Capital of South Sudan
 Cities of South Sudan

Demography of South Sudan 

Demographics of South Sudan

Government and politics of South Sudan 

Politics of South Sudan
 Form of government: Federal presidential democratic republic
 Capital of South Sudan: Capital of South Sudan
 Elections in South Sudan
 (specific elections)
 Political parties in South Sudan

Branches of the government of South Sudan 

Government of South Sudan

Executive branch of the government of South Sudan 
 Head of state: President of South Sudan, 
 List of presidents of South Sudan
 List of vice-presidents of South Sudan
 Head of government: President of South Sudan, 
 Cabinet of South Sudan
 List of Finance Ministers of South Sudan
 Ministries of South Sudan
 Ministry of Agriculture and Forestry (South Sudan)
 Ministry of Animal Resources and Fisheries (South Sudan)
 Ministry of Cabinet Affairs (South Sudan)
 Ministry of Commerce, Industry and Investment (South Sudan)
 Ministry of Culture, Youth and Sports (South Sudan)
 Ministry of Defence and Veterans Affairs (South Sudan)
 Ministry of Education, Science and Technology (South Sudan)
 Ministry of Electricity and Dams (South Sudan)
 Ministry of Environment (South Sudan)
 Ministry of Finance and Economic Planning (South Sudan)
 Ministry of Foreign Affairs and International Cooperation (South Sudan)
 Ministry of Gender, Social Welfare and Religious Affairs (South Sudan)
 Ministry of Health (South Sudan)
 Ministry of Higher Education, Science and Technology (South Sudan)
 Ministry of Housing, Physical Planning and Environment (South Sudan)
 Ministry of Humanitarian Affairs and Disaster Management (South Sudan)
 Ministry of Information and Broadcasting (South Sudan)
 Ministry of Internal Affairs (South Sudan)
 Ministry of Irrigation and Water Resources (South Sudan)
 Ministry of Justice (South Sudan)
 Ministry of Labour, Public Service and Human Resource Development (South Sudan)
 Ministry of National Security (South Sudan)
 Ministry of Parliamentary Affairs (South Sudan)
 Ministry of Peace and CPA Implementation (South Sudan)
 Ministry of Petroleum and Mining (South Sudan)
 Ministry of Roads and Bridges (South Sudan)
 Ministry of Telecommunication and Postal Services (South Sudan)
 Ministry of Transport and Roads (South Sudan)
 Ministry of Wildlife Conservation and Tourism (South Sudan)

Legislative branch of the government of South Sudan 
 National Legislature of South Sudan (bicameral)
 Upper house: National Legislative Assembly
 Lower house: Council of States

Judicial branch of the government of South Sudan 

Judiciary of South Sudan
 Supreme Court of South Sudan

Foreign relations of South Sudan 

Foreign relations of South Sudan
 Diplomatic missions in South Sudan
 List of Ambassadors of the United Kingdom to South Sudan
 People's Republic of China Ambassador to South Sudan
 United Nations Mission in South Sudan
 United States Ambassador to South Sudan
 Diplomatic missions of South Sudan
 Egypt–South Sudan relations
 India–South Sudan relations
 Israel–South Sudan relations
 South Sudan–Sudan relations
 South Sudan–Uganda relations
 South Sudan–United States relations
 Philippines–South Sudan relations

International organization membership 

International organization membership of South Sudan
South Sudan is a member of:

African Union (AU)
Food and Agriculture Organization (FAO)
Group of 77 (G77)
International Bank for Reconstruction and Development (IBRD)
International Civil Aviation Organization (ICAO)
International Red Cross and Red Crescent Movement (ICRM)
International Development Association (IDA)
International Fund for Agricultural Development (IFAD)
International Finance Corporation (IFC)
International Federation of Red Cross and Red Crescent Societies (IFRCS)
International Labour Organization (ILO)
International Monetary Fund (IMF)
International Criminal Police Organization (Interpol)
International Organization for Migration (IOM)
Inter-Parliamentary Union (IPU)
Multilateral Investment Guarantee Agency (MIGA)
United Nations (UN)
United Nations Conference on Trade and Development (UNCTAD)
United Nations Educational, Scientific, and Cultural Organization (UNESCO)
Universal Postal Union (UPU)
World Customs Organization (WCO)
World Health Organization (WHO)
World Meteorological Organization (WMO)

Law and order in South Sudan 

Law of South Sudan
 Constitution of South Sudan
 Human rights in South Sudan
 LGBT rights in South Sudan
 Law enforcement in South Sudan
 South Sudan Police Service
 Visa policy of South Sudan

Military of South Sudan 

Military of South Sudan
 Command
 Commander-in-chief: President of South Sudan
 Ministry of Defence and Veterans Affairs (South Sudan)
 Forces
 Army of South Sudan
 Navy of South Sudan: none

Local government in South Sudan 

Local government in South Sudan

History of South Sudan 

History of South Sudan

History of South Sudan, by period 
 Addis Ababa Agreement (1972)
 Anyanya
 First Sudanese Civil War
 Second Sudanese Civil War
 South Kordofan conflict
 Southern Sudan Autonomous Region (1972–1983)
 Comprehensive Peace Agreement (2005)
 Constitution of Southern Sudan (2005)
 Southern Sudan Autonomous Region (2005–2011)
 South Sudanese independence referendum, 2011
 Sudanese nomadic conflicts
 South Sudan internal conflict (2011–present)
 2012 South Sudan–Sudan border war

History of South Sudan, by region

History of South Sudan, by subject 
 Military history of South Sudan
 South Sudan Defence Forces

Culture of South Sudan 

 Child marriage in South Sudan
Culture of South Sudan
 Languages of South Sudan
 Bai language (South Sudan)
 Baka language (South Sudan)
 Beli language (South Sudan)
 Lango language (South Sudan)
 Media in South Sudan
 National symbols of South Sudan
 Coat of arms of South Sudan
 Flag of South Sudan
 National anthem of South Sudan
 People of South Sudan
 Aja people (South Sudan)
 Bai people (South Sudan)
 Baka people (Congo and South Sudan)
 Bongo people (South Sudan)
 Lango people (South Sudan)
 Prostitution in South Sudan
 Public holidays in South Sudan
 Religion in South Sudan
 Christianity in South Sudan
 Roman Catholicism in South Sudan
 List of Roman Catholic dioceses in South Sudan
 Hinduism in South Sudan
 Islam in South Sudan
 Scouting and Guiding in South Sudan
 South Sudan Scout Association
 World Heritage Sites in South Sudan

Art in South Sudan

Sports in South Sudan 

Sports in South Sudan
 Basketball in South Sudan
 South Sudan national basketball team
 Football in South Sudan
 National football teams
 South Sudan national football team
 South Sudan national football team results
 South Sudan women's national football team
 South Sudan Football Association
 South Sudan Football Championship
 South Sudan at the Olympics
 South Sudan National Cup

Economy and infrastructure of South Sudan 

Economy of South Sudan
 Economic rank (by nominal GDP): 
 Banking in South Sudan
 Central bank: Bank of South Sudan
 Banks in South Sudan
 Communications in South Sudan
 Media of South Sudan
 Postage stamps and postal history of South Sudan
 Telecommunications in South Sudan
 Telephone numbers in South Sudan
 Companies of South Sudan
 Currency of South Sudan: 
 South Sudanese pound
 Energy in South Sudan
 Power stations in South Sudan
 Health care in South Sudan
 Hospitals in South Sudan
 Mining in South Sudan
 Tourism in South Sudan
 Transport in South Sudan
 Air transport in South Sudan
 Airlines of South Sudan
 Airports in South Sudan
 Rail transport in South Sudan
 Railway stations in South Sudan
 Water supply and sanitation in South Sudan
 Water supply in South Sudan

Education in South Sudan 

Education in South Sudan
 Universities in South Sudan
 Catholic University of South Sudan
 Women's education in South Sudan

People from South Sudan
Francis Barsan, politician 
Muki Batali, politician 
Paul Lodu Bureng, politician 
John Malish Dujuk, politician 
Baptist Sabit Frances, politician
Ngota Ifeny, politician
Emmanuel Ija, politician
Felix Ladu, politician 
Paterno Legge, politician
Stephen Lemi Lokuron, politician 
Vincent Kujo Lubong, politician 
Thomas Lodu, politician 
Mary Karlino Madut, politician
Clement Maring, politician 
Juliet Raphael Michael, politician 
Hellen Murshali, politician 
Ajonye Paperture, politician
Richard Remo, politician 
Adil Athanasio Surrur, politician
Wol Dheil Thiep, politician
John Lodu Tombe, politician
Michael Tongun, politician
Luka Anthony Ubur, politician
Efisio Kon Uguak, politician
Manasseh Lomole Waya, politician

See also 

 List of international rankings
 Outline of geography
 Bor Airport (South Sudan)
 Bor District (South Sudan)
 Daga River (South Sudan)
 List of South Sudanese state governors
 Pongo River (South Sudan)
 South Sudan Communist Party
 South Sudan Democratic Movement
 South Sudan Liberal Party
 South Sudan Liberation Movement
 South Sudan Oyee!
 South Sudan Relief and Rehabilitation Commission
 South Sudanese general election, 2010
 South Sudanese passport
 Talent Search South Sudan 2012
 The Citizen (South Sudan)
 Water For South Sudan

References

External links 

 Government of South Sudan
 Government of South Sudan – USA and UN Mission
 Government of South Sudan – UK Mission
 Southern Sudan Legislative Assembly
 South Sudan. The World Factbook. Central Intelligence Agency.
 
 South Sudan profile from the BBC News.
"Sudan's Shaky Peace", National Geographic, November 2010.
Photo gallery by George Steinmetz.
Peace Agreements signed by South Sudan, UN Peacemaker

South Sudan
 1